Nanchang Metro Line 4 is the fourth metro line to open in Nanchang, Jiangxi, China, which opened on 26 December 2021.

Opening timeline

Map

Stations

References

04
Railway lines opened in 2021